Leptocneria is a genus of moths in the subfamily Lymantriinae erected by Arthur Gardiner Butler in 1886. The wings of the moth are generally dark brown, with some variations containing a medley of dark and light hues.

Species
Leptocneria reducta
Leptocneria binotata
Leptocneria vinarskii

References

Lymantriinae